The Phantom of the Open Hearth is an American made-for-television family-comedy film, directed by Fred Barzyk and David R. Loxton, with a script written by Jean Shepherd. Produced by Loxton, the movie is the first installment in the Ralph Parker franchise, and is notable for influencing studio interest in A Christmas Story years later. Based on Shepherd's book, In God We Trust: All Others Pay Cash and similar to all the other Parker Family movies, the film depicts fictionalized events from his real-life childhood.

Synopsis
A middle-aged Ralph Parker introduces the film, before the events of the movie flashback to the past. Set during 1950s America, high school-aged Ralph prepares for the upcoming junior-promenade dance. Every day at school he tries to overcome his shyness and ask his crush, a popular classmate named Daphne Bigelow, to the event. At home, Ralph finds himself at odds with his father and his over-involved mother. His parents are busy with their own interests: Mr. Parker once again looks forward to the arrival of a tasteless lamp shipment he won in a bowling contest, while Mrs. Parker often attends "dish night" at the local movie theater to acquire a collection of dinner dishes. Though Ralph decides to ask his geeky neighbor Wanda Hickey to the dance, he continues to wish he could win the affections of Daphne. Later with his friends and their dates, Ralph drinks alcohol excessively. The group finds themselves sick and vomiting in the bathroom stall, during the eventful night of junior prom.

Cast
 David Elliot as Ralph "Ralphie" Parker
 Jean Shepherd as Ralph Parker/the Narrator
 James Broderick as Mr. Parker
 Barbara Bolton as Mrs. Parker
 Adam Goodman as Randy Parker
 William Lampley as Flick
 Bryan Utman as Schwartz
 Ed Huberman as Carl Parker
 Tobi Pilavin as Daphne Bigelow
 Roberta Wallach as Wanda Hickey

Release
The Phantom of the Open Hearth was released on December 23, 1976 during an episode of PBS's anthological television series, Visions.

Reception
Upon release the film was met with mostly positive reception, with praise directed at the sentimental value and nostalgic look at the history, the cast's performance, as well as Shepherd's skills in storytelling. Criticism stated that the plot took itself perhaps a little too seriously. Retrospective reviews give the television movie mixed reviews.

Sequels
The movie was followed by a number of sequels, spawning a franchise of films, an adaptation for stage, and a television broadcast adaptation of that play. The film's first follow-up to be released, was The Great American Fourth of July and Other Disasters in 1982.

Unaired television series adaptation
The film was reshot and intended to serve as the pilot episode for an ongoing series with a prospective release in 1978. Though the finished product never aired, production was completed. The production was directed by John Rich, with a script by Jean Shepherd, cinematography by Roland 'Ozzie' Smith, and editing from Dick Bartlett. Filmed with a working title the same as the 1976 film, the cast included John Shepherd, Richard Venture, Barbara Bolton, and Jean Shepherd as young Ralph "Ralphie" Parker, Mr. Parker, Mrs. Parker, and Ralph Parker/the Narrator, respectively. The series included the original introduction of the famous "Oh, fudge (but I didn't say 'fudge')!" line which was later introduced in A Christmas Story.

References

External links
 

1976 films
American comedy television films
1970s English-language films
Films directed by Fred Barzyk
1970s American films